Joonas Matti Nordman (born 9 July 1986, in Pori, Finland) is a Finnish actor, comedian, impersonator, director and screenwriter, best known as an actor and a director of popular Finnish sketch comedy television show Putous (2014–2015, 2017–2018). He is also one of the cast members in Finnish sketch comedy television show Pyjama Party (2014–2016).

In 2011–2014, Nordman was one of the comedians in Finnish political satire YleLeaks. He is also known as an impersonator. He has imitated several famous Finnish politicians, such as Sauli Niinistö, Juha Sipilä, Antti Rinne, Jussi Halla-aho, Ville Niinistö, Jussi Niinistö, Harry Harkimo, Juhana Vartiainen, Matti Vanhanen, Timo Soini, Paavo Arhinmäki, Simon Elo, Touko Aalto and Ilkka Kanerva. Nordman's own imitation television series Pelimies began on MTV3 in 2016.

Nordman is the Finnish voice actor of Moomintroll in the Finnish-British animated television family drama Moominvalley (2019–).

References

living people
1986 births
21st-century Finnish male actors
Finnish male comedians
People from Pori